Mackay Stadium is an outdoor athletic stadium in the western United States, located on the campus of the University of Nevada in Reno, Nevada. The home venue for Nevada Wolf Pack football and women's soccer in the Mountain West Conference. it is named in honor of the Mackay family, particularly John William Mackay and his son Clarence H. Mackay, who donated funding to build the original stadium in 1909.

History
Located on the northern portion of campus, at 17th Street & East Stadium Way, the stadium opened  on October 1, 1966 with a seating capacity of 7,500. It replaced the original Mackay Stadium, formerly located in the bowl containing Hilliard Plaza, the Mack Social Sciences building and the Reynolds School of Journalism. Both stadiums were named for the Mackay family, who were university benefactors in the early years of the school. The stadium currently seats 27,000 and has played to crowds in excess. 

Renovations
Permanent lighting was installed in 2003 to allow the option of night games. Originally natural grass, synthetic infilled FieldTurf was installed in 2000, 2010, and 2022. In 2013, the playing surface at Mackay Stadium was named Chris Ault Field in honor of the former Wolf Pack head coach, College Football Hall of Famer, creator of the Pistol offense in 2004 and for his contributions to Wolf Pack football. Due to a $1.3 million sponsorship of the 2022 turf replacement, the stadium's playing surface is now officially referred to as "Chris Ault Field presented by ITS Logistics."

A proposal passed by the Nevada Board of Regents (NSHE) upgraded seating options to the stadium for the 2016 season. This renovation has improved the quality of the fans' experiences but decreased the overall stadium capacity to 26,000. Higher ticket fees in the upgraded sections will repay this $11.5 million bond by 2031.

Attendance
The Wolf Pack football single–season attendance record was set in 1991 with a total of 180,457 fans over nine home games, including playoffs; and the regular-season attendance record was set at 151,081 fans in 1993. The single-season attendance record for a Wolf Pack team with a losing record (at 149,635 fans) was set in 2013. 2014 was the third football season to have at least 20,000 fans in attendance at every home game (1993 and 2013), although multiple seasons were close.

Top 25 single-game attendance records

Top 10 season average attendance records

Top 10 season overall attendance records

Other uses
Originally, the Nevada women's soccer team played home games for their inaugural 2000 season at Mendive Middle School in Sparks, Nevada. The following 2001 season, The Pack did not host any soccer home games.  Mackay Stadium has played home to the women's soccer team since 2002.
The soccer team has hosted home crowds with over 1,000 on three occasions. The record was actually set at the Moana Sports Complex in Reno on September 15, 2013, with a record of 1,050 fans in attendance, where the Wolf Pack beat Sacramento State, 3–2. Soccer's home-game attendance record at Mackay Stadium is 1,043 fans, as the Wolf Pack beat Wyoming, 1–0, on October 18, 2015. The third-largest Nevada soccer game with over 1,000 fans was also held at Mackay Stadium with 1,007 fans on September 23, 2012, as the Wolf Pack lost 0–3 to No. 15 California.

See also
 List of NCAA Division I FBS football stadiums

References

External links
 Mackay Stadium: Home of Wolf Pack Football and Wolf Pack Soccer
 Mackay Stadium – University of Nevada, Reno

1966 establishments in Nevada
American football venues in Nevada
College football venues
Nevada Wolf Pack football
Nevada Wolf Pack sports venues
Sports venues completed in 1966
Sports venues in Reno, Nevada